Gascogne may refer to:

Geography
Gascony (French Gascogne), a region and former province of France
Côtes de Gascogne, a wine-growing area of Gascony
Golfe de Gascogne, an alternative name for the Bay of Biscay

People
Matthias Gascogne, a 16th-century French composer
Severus de Gascogne, a suggested Duke of Aquitaine

Other
French battleship Gascogne (1914), a Normandie-class battleship of the French Navy.
Basset Bleu de Gascogne, a breed of dog
Grand Bleu de Gascogne, a breed of dog
Petit Bleu de Gascogne, a breed of dog
Griffon Bleu de Gascogne, a breed of dog
Floc de Gascogne, an apéritif

See also
Gascoigne